Wei Nan (Chinese: 魏楠) (born 4 January 1984) is a badminton player from Hong Kong. He was a member of Hong Kong team in 2014 Thomas & Uber Cup. He became the first men's singles medalist for Hong Kong by winning a bronze medal in 2014 Asian Games.

Achievements

Asian Games 
Men's singles

BWF Grand Prix 
The BWF Grand Prix had two levels, the Grand Prix and Grand Prix Gold. It was a series of badminton tournaments sanctioned by the Badminton World Federation (BWF) and played between 2007 and 2017.

Men's singles

  Grand Prix Tournament

BWF International Challenge/Series 
Men's singles

  BWF International Challenge tournament

References 

Hong Kong male badminton players
Living people
Asian Games medalists in badminton
Badminton players at the 2014 Asian Games
1984 births
Badminton players from Fujian
Asian Games bronze medalists for Hong Kong
Medalists at the 2014 Asian Games
21st-century Hong Kong people